Get Right with the Man is the fourth studio album by American musical duo Van Zant. It was released in 2005 by Columbia Records. It peaked at number 2 on the Top Country Albums chart, and was certified Gold by the RIAA. The album includes the singles "Help Somebody", "Nobody Gonna Tell Me What to Do" and "Things I Miss the Most".
The song "I'm Doin' Alright", was featured in the 2006 EA Sports game NASCAR 07.

This album has been released with the Copy Control protection system in some regions.

Track listing

Personnel
Taken from liner notes.

Van Zant
 Johnny Van Zant – lead vocals, background vocals
 Donnie Van Zant – lead vocals, background vocals

Additional Musicians
 Bekka Bramlett – background vocals
 Tom Bukovac – electric guitar
 Perry Coleman – background vocals
 Eric Darken – percussion
 Glen Duncan – fiddle
 Kenny Greenberg – electric guitar
 Greg Morrow – drums, percussion
 Russ Pahl – lap steel guitar, steel guitar, banjo
 Michael Rhodes – bass guitar
 Jeffrey Steele – background vocals
 Trez – background vocals
 John Willis – acoustic guitar
 Glenn Worf – bass guitar
 Reese Wynans – B3 organ, keyboards, piano, Wurlitzer

Chart performance

Weekly charts

Year-end charts

Singles

Certifications

References

2005 albums
Van Zant (band) albums
Columbia Records albums
Albums produced by Mark Wright (record producer)